Leonardo de Matos Cruz (born 2 April 1986), better known as Léo Matos, is a former Brazilian professional footballer who played as a right back.

Club career
Starting from the academies of Flamengo and having been for a short time in Marseille, Leo Matos did not find his best in this small passage from Europe and fought exclusively in his homeland until 2010, when he moved to Ukraine. In Chornomorets Odesa, he learned to focus in defence and remain faithful to tactics. The Chornomorets coach Roman Hryhorchuk, with whom he worked with, before moved to Dnipro Dnipropetrovsk, was the one who actually helped him to change. "...We watched video every single day, we learned tactics and defense, thinking that in football is not only attack..." has said in an earlier interview. Although he is a full back, he played most of the Chornomorets Odesa matches as a right midfielder, proving he can cover the whole right ring. In summer of 2014, he signed for Dnipro Dnipropetrovsk changing his position to left full back, a quite successful move. He participated in the UEFA Europa League final, where his team lost from Sevilla FC.

PAOK

On 8 May 2016, the 30-year-old solved his contract with Dnipro Dnipropetrovsk due to serious economic problems of the club and he joined PAOK. The acquisition of the player is expected to be announced after the end of the Superleague playoffs and until then all formalities (medical examinations, duration of contract etc.) with the player will take place. On 18 August 2016, in his third appearance for PAOK, Leo Matos scored a wonderful goal helping the club to escape with a 3–0 away win against FC Dinamo Tbilisi in the UEFA Europa League playoffs. On 11 December 2016, he scored a second-half brace (62', 81'), helping his team to win 3–0 against Platanias at Toumba Stadium. On 17 August 2017, he helped PAOK complete a remarkable turnaround and defeat Östersunds FK 3–1 at home scoring a crucial goal in the second half of the 1st leg of the UEFA Europa League play-offs. On 30 September 2017, he scored his first goal for the 2017-18 Super League season in a 1–1 away draw against AEL On 22 October 2017, the club unofficially announced that his contract will be extended till the summer of 2021 with better financial earnings. On 20 December he scored a brace in a 5–1 away Greek Cup win against Trikala On 6 January 2018, he opened the score in a 5–0 home win against Levadiakos., and he repeated a week later in the next matchday in a 3–0 away win against Kerkyra.

On 15 September 2018, he scored his first goal for the 2018-19 Super League season, as he rose highest to head home from a corner in the fifth minute of added time just before the referee blew the half-time whistle,  in a 3–1 away win against OFI. On 16 March 2019, he scored as rose to head home Diego Biseswar's right-wing corner with Nikos Giannakopoulos helpless to react in time, sealing a vital 2–1 away win against Panetolikos in his club's rally to win the first championship title since 1985. On 3 April 2019, he scored a brace in the Greek Cup semifinal 1st leg to earn a 2–0 advantage ahead of the second leg against Asteras Tripoli. PAOK were only 1–0 up deep into stoppage time, but after Walter Iglesias received a red card, Matos scored his second goal with a wonderful half-volley which sailed beyond the outstretched grasp of Giorgos Athanasiadis.

On 6 August 2019, in his first official performance for the 2019–20 season, he scored with a powerful header after an assist from Diego Biseswar that emphatically past Ajax goalkeeper Andre Onana, in a home game against last season's UEFA Champions League semi-finalists Ajax in the first leg of their UEFA Champions League third qualifying round tie that ended in a 2–2 draw. On 22 September 2019, scored with a header after a corner from Josip Mišić in a 2–2 home draw with Aris.

On 4 January 2020, Matos scored with a low shot following a free-kick, to close the score in an away 4–2 loss against rivals Aris Thessaloniki F.C., as PAOK were finally beaten after 51 games in Super League I.
At the end of a frustrating 2019-20 season, Leo Matos was one step away from leaving PAOK and lately he was looking for a team to continue his career, but it seems that despite the fact that the Brazilian, was out of Abel Ferreira's initial plans for a long time, the situation is reversed with Matos remaining in Toumba and now stopping the search for another team.

Vasco da Gama
On 23 October 2020, Leo Matos has agreed a two-year contract with Vasco da Gama and his transfer is expected to be completed immediately, as PAOK informed. The personal problem that Leo Matos has been facing for several months is likely to lead him to Brazil, as the transfer window is open until 9 November. Matos came to PAOK in 2016 from Dnipro and became immediately one of the key players for the club. In four years has 168 appearances with the club in all competitions, scored 26 goals, and had 16 assists. On 2 November 2020 he opened the score in his first appearance with the club in a 1-1 home draw game against Goiás Esporte Clube.

International career
There were talks of possible naturalization of him to play for the Ukraine national football team, and eventually succeeded to gain a second citizenship.

Career statistics

Club

Honours
Dnipro Dnipropetrovsk
 UEFA Europa League: runner-up 2014–15

PAOK
 Super League Greece: 2018–19
 Greek Cup: 2016–17, 2017–18, 2018–19

Brazil U-17
 FIFA U-17 World Cup: 2003
Individual
 Super League Greece Team of the Year: 2016–17 2017–18

References

External links

1986 births
Living people
Sportspeople from Niterói
Association football fullbacks
Association football midfielders
Brazilian footballers
Brazil youth international footballers
Brazilian expatriate footballers
CR Flamengo footballers
Olympique de Marseille players
Paraná Clube players
FC Chornomorets Odesa players
Tombense Futebol Clube players
FC Dnipro players
PAOK FC players
CR Vasco da Gama players
Expatriate footballers in Ukraine
Ukrainian Premier League players
Brazilian expatriate sportspeople in Ukraine
Expatriate footballers in Greece
Brazilian expatriate sportspeople in Greece
Super League Greece players